Pizzo Ferré (3,103 m) is a mountain of the Lepontine Alps, located west of Isola in the Italian region of Lombardy. The Swiss border runs 140 metres west of the summit at approximately 3,040 m.

On the north side lies a glacier named Ghiacciaio del Pizzo Ferré.

References

External links
Montespluga-Pizzo Ferré

Alpine three-thousanders
Lepontine Alps
Mountains of Lombardy
Mountains of the Alps
Mountains partially in Switzerland